Karlo Šimek (born 3 June 1988) is a Croatian footballer who plays for NK Polet Tuhovec as a defender.

Club career 
A graduate of the Varteks youth academy, Šimek was promoted to the senior squad in 2007, which changed its name to NK Varaždin in mid-2010. In January 2012, he had a try-out with Kazakh club Shakhter Karagandy in Turkey, but in the process, he injured his leg. In the same month, Istra 1961 also expressed their desire to sign him. He ultimately signed for Karlovac after having made 103 appearances for Varteks / Varaždin.

After a stint with Croatian club Zelina, Šimek moved abroad, signing for Austrian club Lafnitz. He went on to represent Gorica and Deutschkreutz, before signing for Međimurje in January 2016. In January 2017, he signed with a different NK Varaždin, a club unassociated with the one he started his career with, but which went bankrupt in 2015.

Career statistics

Club

References

External links

Austrian career stats - ÖFB

1988 births
Living people
Sportspeople from Varaždin
Association football defenders
Croatian footballers
Croatia youth international footballers
Croatia under-21 international footballers
NK Varaždin players
NK Karlovac players
NK Zelina players
SV Lafnitz players
HNK Gorica players
NK Međimurje players
NK Varaždin (2012) players
Croatian Football League players
First Football League (Croatia) players
Austrian Regionalliga players
Austrian Landesliga players
Croatian expatriate footballers
Expatriate footballers in Austria
Croatian expatriate sportspeople in Austria